The Treaty of Tordesillas signed on November 15, 1524 ratified the treaty of Burgos signed on June 7, 1524, between the Lord of Monaco and Habsburg Spain.  The treaty placed Monaco under the protection of Charles V, Holy Roman Emperor and King of Spain, as an imperial fief. As a consequence, the Lord of Monaco became subservient to Charles as his vassal and it was the beginning of the so-called Spanish protectorate over Monaco.

Thus, the Lord of Monaco was required to give feudal homage, but Lucien I of Monaco requested that requirement be removed from the treaty and obtained for the final proclamation of November 1524 to recognize the autonomy of Monaco.

Background: Monaco caught in the fire of the Italian Wars 

On August 22, 1523, the ruling Prince of Monaco, Lucien Grimaldi was assassinated by his cousin Barthélémy Doria, who stabbed him forty-two times. The population of Monaco intervened in favour of the Grimaldi dynasty and refused this coup. Barthélémy Doria who tried to escape his crime was caught and detained in the vicinity of La Turbie before being released by the House of Savoy. Meanwhile, Augustine Grimaldi, younger brother of Lucien and then bishop of Grasse, rose to the throne of Monaco as a regent in favour of his nephew Honoré by dispositions of his mother Claudine Grimaldi.

Fearing for the sovereignty of his Principality, Augustine Grimaldi obtained from Pope Clement VII a papal bull promulgated on February 19, 1524, which consecrated the autonomy of Monaco.

However, despite the support of French King François I, Augustine Grimaldi was blocked by the superseding influence of Andrea Doria at the Court of France, impeding him from prosecuting Barthélémy Doria for his crime. In order to obtain justice, Augustine Grimaldi obtained the vassality of Genovese territories under the influence of Andrea Doria and on November 3, 1523, the citizens of Dolceaqua came to pledge allegiance to the Grimaldi.

Following the defeat of Guillaume Gouffier, seigneur de Bonnivet, at the battle of Gattinara in 1524, François I was losing influence in the area while Andra Doria's gallera plundered the Monegasque coast and Augustine Grimaldi was almost killed by the bombardments of these galleras in Menton.

These events "forced" Augustineto pick up on the negotiations that his brother Lucien Grimaldi had begun with the lieutenants of Charles Quint. Augustine Grimaldi offered the port of Monaco to be used as a military basis for the troops of the Charles III, constable of Bourbon, the last of the great feudal lord to oppose the king of France.

Content: the reason of two treaties

The Treaty of Burgos and the refusal of feodality 
In June 1524, Leonard Grimaldi was sent as by Augustine Grimaldi as his procurator to Sapin to negotiate with the imperial chancery.

A treaty was signed in Burgos on June 7, which stipulated not only the imperial protection granted to Monaco but its first article stipulated that the Lord of Monaco and his heirs should pay tribute to the Emperor thus transforming a mere protection into a vassality as form of protectorate. Despite his fragile position in the negotiation, Augustine Grimaldi firmly protested this disposition. Augustinecould count on the support of the constable of Bourbon, whom he helped continuously as the imperial forces retreated from Provence and heroically resisted in the port of Marseille.

The Treaty of Tordesillas and the consecration of the freedom of Monaco 
On November 15, 1524, the treaty of Burgos was ratified in Tordesillas which included the protection of Augustine Grimaldi and explicitly mentioned that Monaco was absolutely independent from any superior powers, with any contrary disposition being void. The Spanish Emperor considered the Lord of Monaco as his "friend".

Through this alliance, a pension was given to Monaco in times of war and a garrison would be recruited and paid for by the Emperor to protect it as a  visible sign of the "imperial immediacy" on Monaco. Indemnities would be given for any goods seized by the Kingdom of France in retaliation. Finally, the constable of Bourbon would oversee the transfer of properties from Barthélémy Doria to the House of Grimaldi. Various privileges were obtained for the Lord of Monaco to obtain ecclesiastical benefits from Sardinia and Sicily.

On April 10, 1525, Augustine Grimaldi ratified by way of sealed letters patent an act, which, for the next 118 years, would place Monaco in the orbit of Spanish politics.

Aftermath

Unhoped for success at the Battle of Pavia 

Through the strategic position of Monaco, the troops of the Empire were able to secure a strong connection between Spain and the Milanese troops, which was an element in the decisive victory of the Habsburgs of Spain at the Battle of Pavia in February 1525. Charles Quint expressed his gratitude to Augustine Grimaldi for his support.

Tragic death of Barthélémy Doria 
After finally capturing Barthélémy Doria, Augustine Grimaldi had him judged in Monaco, and assigned to the capital punishment. However, Pope Clement VII opposed this sentence and Barthélémy was release. Later, when, during the night, he attacked the castle of La Penna owned by Augustine Grimaldi, Barthélémy Doria perished as he fell to the ground in an attempt to escalate up the cliff that led to the fortress.

Treaty of Madrid in 1526: a promise with no effects 
As a result of the Treaty of Tordesillas, Monaco was included in the Treaty of Madrid signed in 1526 between France and Spain. The intention was tu return any properties confiscated by the Kingdom of France to the Lord of Monaco. However, these provisions were never duly implemented.

On the way to his crowning in Bologna, Emperor Charles V made a four-day stop in Monaco from August 5 to August 9, 1529, manifesting his benevolence.

However, despite the appearance of support of the Emperor, who even suggested that Augustine Grimaldi should be raised to the cardinalate, it seems that the appearances were delusive, as little was done for Monaco. Meanwhile, Andrea Doria had changed sides and become a close ally of the Emperor too. AugustineGrimaldy sought to balance his alliance and secretly dealt with the Kingdom of France, before dying, in mysterious circumstances, in 1532.

In December 1523, Francisco de Valenzuela was accredited as imperial resident in Monaco before being chased to Genoa by regent Etienne Grimaldi in May 1534, in an attempt to curtail the influence of Spain on Monaco. Thus, Etienne would later refuse another visit of the Emperor while welcoming Pope Paul III for a visit to Monaco in May 1538.

Monaco was once again included in the Treaty of Crepy in 1544.

References

Bibliography 
 The Microstates of Europe
History of Monaco retrieved 9 February 2007

History of Monaco
Treaties of Monaco
Treaties of the Spanish Empire
1524 in the Spanish Empire
16th century in Monaco
1524 in Europe
1524 treaties
History of the province of Burgos